This article presents a list of the historical events and publications of Australian literature during 1948.

Books 
 Eleanor Dark – Storm of Time
 George Johnston
 Death Takes Small Bites
 The Moon at Perigee
 Jack Lindsay – Men of Forty-Eight
 Alan Moorehead – The Rage of the Vulture
 Vance Palmer – Golconda
 Ruth Park
 The Harp in the South
 Missus
 Katharine Susannah Prichard – Golden Miles
 Nevil Shute – No Highway
 Christina Stead – A Little Tea, a Little Chat
 E. V. Timms – Forever to Remain
 Arthur Upfield
 An Author Bites the Dust
 The Mountains Have a Secret
 Patrick White – The Aunt's Story
 June Wright – Murder in the Telephone Exchange

Short stories 
 A. Bertram Chandler – "Dawn of Nothing"
 Judah Waten – "Black Girl in the Street"

Children's and Young Adult fiction 
 Nan Chauncy – They Found a Cave

Poetry 

 David Campbell – "The End of Exploring"
 Dulcie Deamer – The Silver Branch : Twenty-Seven Poems
 Rosemary Dobson
 "Carried Away"
 "On a Tapestry"
 The Ship of Ice : With Other Poems
 Mary Gilmore – Selected Verse
 Nan McDonald – "The Barren Ground"
 Kenneth Mackenzie – "The Children Go"
 Elizabeth Riddell – Poems
 Roland Robinson
 "Swift"
 "Would I Might Find My Country"
 Francis Webb
 A Drum for Ben Boyd
 "For My Grandfather"
 Judith Wright
 "Train Journey"
 "Wonga Vine"

Drama 
 Sumner Locke Elliott – Rusty Bugles
 Ruth Park – The Uninvited Guest

Biography 
 Henry Handel Richardson – Myself When Young

Children's and Young Adults non-fiction 
 Frank Hurley – Shackleton's Argonauts : A Saga of the Antarctic Icepacks

Awards and honours

Literary

Children's and Young Adult

Poetry

Births 
A list, ordered by date of birth (and, if the date is either unspecified or repeated, ordered alphabetically by surname) of births in 1948 of Australian literary figures, authors of written works or literature-related individuals follows, including year of death.

 16 February – Jeff Guess, poet 
 18 March – Di Morrissey, novelist
 20 March – Dianne Bates, writer for children
 2 April – Jennifer Rowe, novelist
 23 April – John A. Scott, novelist
 20 May – Kate Jennings, novelist and poet (died 2021)
 23 July – Alan Wearne, poet
 24 July — Joan London, novelist
 12 September – Michael Dransfield, poet (died 1973)
 21 September – Sean McMullen, novelist
 2 November – Jenny Pausacker, novelist

Unknown date
 Pam Brown, poet
 Martin Duwell, editor
 Dennis Haskell, poet
 Dorothy Johnston, novelist
 Margaret Wild, writer for children

Deaths 

A list, ordered by date of death (and, if the date is either unspecified or repeated, ordered alphabetically by surname) of deaths in 1948 of Australian literary figures, authors of written works or literature-related individuals follows, including year of birth.

 20 May – Marie E. J. Pitt, poet (born 1869)

Unknown date
 R. J. Cassidy, poet (born 1880)

See also 
 1948 in poetry
 List of years in literature
 List of years in Australian literature
 1948 in literature
 1947 in Australian literature
 1948 in Australia
 1949 in Australian literature

References

Literature
Australian literature by year
20th-century Australian literature
1948 in literature